Proceso a Mariana Pineda is a Spanish historical drama television miniseries directed by Rafael Moreno Alba, starring Pepa Flores in the leading role of Mariana Pineda. It aired on TVE1 in 1984.

Premise 
Set in Granada in 1831, the plot is a dramatisation of the last days of Mariana Pineda, a female champion of the Liberal cause, a detractor of monarchical absolutism, executed by garrote vil during the Ominous Decade after refusing to betray her partners.

Cast 
 Pepa Flores as Mariana Pineda.
 Germán Cobos as Ramón Pedrosa.
 Juanjo Puigcorbé.
 Carlos Larrañaga.
 José María Caffarel.
 Rafael Alonso.
 .
 .
 Antonio Iranzo.
 .
 Conrado San Martín.
 José Vivó.
 Rosario Flores as Juanita.
 Enrique San Francisco as Federico.
 .
 Teresa del Olmo.
 Sonia Hohmann.

Production and release 
Directed by Rafael Moreno Alba, the 4-month-long filming took place in Madrid, Granada, Boadilla del Monte, Carmona, Seville and Huelva. Consisting of 5 episodes, the serial aired on Televisión Española from November 1984 to December 1984.

References 
Citations

Bibliography

External links 
 Proceso a Mariana Pineda on RTVE Play

Television shows set in Andalusia
Television series set in the 1830s
Television shows filmed in Spain
1984 Spanish television series debuts
1984 Spanish television series endings
Spanish television miniseries
Spanish-language television shows
La 1 (Spanish TV channel) network series
1980s Spanish drama television series